Die da or dit da, is a traditional Chinese method of bone-setting used to treat trauma and injuries such as bone fractures, sprains, and bruises.

Background

Dit da originated in Guangdong, China, and was usually practiced by martial artists who knew aspects of traditional Chinese medicine. Dit da specialists may also use or recommend dit da jow, other Chinese medical therapies, and in modern times, the use of Western medicine if serious injury is involved. Dit da is not commonly practiced in the West, but it is currently practiced in Guangzhou, Hong Kong, Taiwan and Southeast Asia.

Notable practitioners

 Leung Jan
 Wong Fei-hung
 Lam Sai-wing
 Lam Cho
 Kwan Tak-hing
 Luk Chee Fu
 Chris Leong Yann Kong

See also

 Chiropractic
 Joint manipulation
 Sports injury
 Tui na

References

Pseudoscience
Traditional Chinese medicine